The Ruth Suckow House was a historic residence located in Earlville, Iowa, United States.  It is associated with Iowa-born author Ruth Suckow who lived here in the summers of 1925 and 1926.  While in residence she wrote her second novel, The Odyssey of a Nice Girl (1925), and several short stories.  The single-story, frame, cottage was built sometime in the early 20th-century.  It was listed on the National Register of Historic Places in 1977.

References

Houses in Delaware County, Iowa
National Register of Historic Places in Delaware County, Iowa
Houses on the National Register of Historic Places in Iowa
Vernacular architecture in Iowa